CJLM-FM is a French-language Canadian radio station located in Joliette, Quebec, about 40 kilometres (25 miles) northeast of Montreal. The station has an adult contemporary music format and identifies itself as "O103,5" FM. It broadcasts on 103.5 MHz with an effective radiated power of 3,000 watts (class A) using an omnidirectional antenna. The station is owned by Attraction Radio.

CJLM (as it was originally known) opened in April 1960 as an AM station on 1350 kHz, under the ownership of Radio-Richelieu Ltee. as a sister station of CJSO in Sorel. Radio-Richlieu would later sell off CJLM to another broadcaster, Radio de Lanaudière Inc.

Under later owner Diffusion Laurentides Inc., CJLM would relocate to 103.5 FM in 1996, but would soon be sold off in 1997 to "Coopérative de radiodiffusion MF 103,5 de Lanaudière", a cooperative that was created to buy the station after the bankruptcy of Diffusion Laurentides.

In 2013, Attraction Radio announced plans to acquire CJLM-FM from the cooperative; the decision was given CRTC approval on 30 July 2014.

References

External links
 
 

Jlm
Jlm
Jlm
Joliette
Radio stations established in 1960
1960 establishments in Quebec